The 2007 Allstate Sugar Bowl was a college football bowl game, which formed part of the 2006–2007 Bowl Championship Series (BCS) of the 2006 NCAA Division I FBS football season. Played on January 3, 2007, in the Louisiana Superdome in New Orleans, it was the 73rd Sugar Bowl. The game matched the Notre Dame Fighting Irish against the LSU Tigers and was televised on Fox.

This game received extra attention because it was the return of the Sugar Bowl to New Orleans. In 2006, the game was played at the Georgia Dome in Atlanta, Georgia due to the damage caused by Hurricane Katrina to the Superdome (that game also featured a virtual "home" team, the Georgia Bulldogs). LSU won the 2007 contest 41–14, tying the Notre Dame-LSU series at 5–5 (with LSU taking a 2–0 lead in bowl game meetings).

With the loss, Notre Dame lost a record-setting nine bowl games in a row, including losing their three BCS bowl games by wide point margins.

Teams

Notre Dame

Notre Dame, a Division I FBS independent, finished the regular season at 10–2. The Fighting Irish entered the season ranked at no. 2 in the AP Poll before losing 21–47 to no. 11 Michigan in week three. The team won its next eight games, reaching no. 6 in the AP Poll, but lost the regular season finale 24–44 to no. 3 USC. The Fighting Irish entered the Sugar Bowl ranked no. 11 in all three polls.

LSU

LSU, from the Southeastern Conference (SEC), finished the regular season at 10–2. The Tigers entered the season ranked at no. 8 in the AP Poll before losing 3–7 to no. 3 Auburn in week three. The team won its next two games before losing to no. 5 Florida 10–23. The Tigers won their next six games, including victories over no. 8 Tennessee and no. 5 Arkansas. LSU entered the Sugar Bowl ranked no. 4 in all three polls.

Game summary

Statistics

References

Sugar Bowl
Sugar Bowl
LSU Tigers football bowl games
Notre Dame Fighting Irish football bowl games
Sugar Bowl
21st century in New Orleans
January 2007 sports events in the United States